The Swiss Challenge is a golf tournament on the Challenge Tour, held in Switzerland, except in 2021, when it was held in France.

History
It was first played as the Credit Suisse Private Banking Open in 2000 and 2001 at the Golf Club Patriziale Ascona in Ascona. It replaced the Interlaken Open which ended after financial issues. During the course of the 2002 edition, the heavy rain led to the overflow of the Lake Maggiore and to the cancellation of the event.

Following a four-year hiatus, the tournament returned in 2006 and was held at the Wylihof Golf Club in Luterbach through 2009. Since 2010 the event has been played at Golf Sempachersee in Hildisrieden.

In 2021, the event was uniquely held in France. It was played at Golf Saint Apollinaire in Folgensbourg, close to the Swiss border. In round 2 of the 2021 event, Alejandro del Rey shot the first ever round of 58 on any tour in Europe. It was also the lowest round to-par (−14) on any major tour in world golf.

Winners

References

External links
Official website
Coverage on the Challenge Tour's official site

Challenge Tour events
Golf tournaments in Switzerland
Summer events in Switzerland
Recurring sporting events established in 2000
2000 establishments in Switzerland